Citybeat was a pop music group that was active in Hong Kong during the 1980s. There are five members in the group, namely:
 John Laudon
 Daryl Ching
 Jerry Marshall
 Jym Kay
 Chuck D. Eddy－(replaced Daryl Ching on guitar in 1990)

History
John Laudon  (singer) wrote numerous songs for Hong Kong Pop stars. Jym Kay (drummer) was the Host of the television program "Solid Gold" on TVB. The band toured in China, The United States, Singapore, Malaysia, India, and Macau.

All of them are foreigners in Hong Kong. They sang songs in English, but later became known as the first American band to record songs in Cantonese. Some of their songs spread the messages of Christianity.

Publications
They recorded four albums and eight music videos, and on numerous television shows. Citybeat appeared in the eTV in the primary six programme, "CityBeat comes to town". The song "Standing as one" and accompanying video we're on high rotation during the 1989 Tiananmen Square Student movement in China. This song and music video opened doors for them to be the only foreign band to play at the Concert for Democracy in China, held at the Happy Valley Racecourse.

See also
Hong Kong English pop

Cantopop musical groups
Cantonese-language singers
English-language singers from Hong Kong